Epopea subacuta is a species of beetle in the family Cerambycidae. It was described by Stephan von Breuning in 1952.

Subspecies
 Epopea subacuta leleupi Breuning, 1975
 Epopea subacuta subacuta Breuning, 1952

References

Pteropliini
Beetles described in 1952